Zafar Ahmed Muhammad (born 10 July 1913) was a Pakistani sports shooter. He competed at the 1956 Summer Olympics and the 1960 Summer Olympics.

References

External links
 

1913 births
Year of death missing
Pakistani male sport shooters
Olympic shooters of Pakistan
Shooters at the 1956 Summer Olympics
Shooters at the 1960 Summer Olympics
Sportspeople from Gurdaspur district
Sport shooters from Punjab, Pakistan